Joven Alba (born 24 August 1969) is a Filipino professional pool and snooker player. Alba was a professional pool player between 2009 and 2013, and having played snooker beforehand. Alba's biggest accomplishment was winning the team snooker event at the 2005 Southeast Asian Games. Alongside partners Leonardo Andam and Alex Pagulayan the Filipino team defeated Thailand team of Nitiwat Kanjanjanasri, Phaithoon Phonbun and Supoj Saenla in the final.

In pool, Alba reached the quarter-finals of both the 2010 and 2011 WPA World Eight-ball Championships, losing to Darren Appleton on both occasions.

Achievements
 2005 Southeast Asian Games Snooker Team
 1995 Southeast Asian Games Nine-ball Doubles

References

External links

Filipino pool players
Living people
Filipino sportspeople
1969 births